Bela tenuistriata is an extinct species of sea snail. It is a marine gastropod mollusk of the family Mangeliidae.

Description
The length of the shell attains 15.6 mm, its diameter 5.2 mm.

Distribution
This extinct marine species was found in the Lower Pliocene strata in  East Anglia, Great Britain, and in Belgium

References

 Bell, A., 1871. Contributions to the Crag Fauna. Part II.  Annals and Magazine of Natural History, (7), 4: 351-362

External links

tenuistriata